Pamona (also Poso or Bare’e) is an Austronesian language spoken in Central and South Sulawesi, Indonesia. It is part of the northern group of the Kaili–Pamona languages.

Dialects
Ethnologue lists the following as dialects: Laiwonu (Iba), Pamona (Poso), Rapangkaka (Aria), Taa (Topotaa, Wana), Tobau (Bare’e, Tobalo, Tobao), Tokondindi, Tomoni, and Topada.

Phonology
Pamona has the following sound inventory:

Notes

Bibliography

Kaili–Pamona languages
Languages of Sulawesi